Drömkåken is a Swedish comedy film which was released to cinemas in Sweden on 28 October 1993, directed by Peter Dalle. The film is a remake of the 1986 Tom Hanks comedy film The Money Pit, itself a remake of the 1948 Cary Grant comedy film Mr. Blandings Builds His Dream House.

Cast
Björn Skifs as Göran
Suzanne Reuter as Tina
Zara Zetterqvist as Petra
Mikael Håck as Anton
Lena Nyman as Sanna
Jan Malmsjö as The major
Pierre Lindstedt as Ernst
Gunnel Fred as Karin
Pontus Gustafsson as Robert
Johan Ulveson as Fille
Claes Månsson as Mats
Peter Dalle as Thomas
Anders Ekborg as Plumber
Johan Paulsen as Building worker in bathroom
Sven-Åke Wahlström as Carpenter in kitchen
Johan Rabaeus as Martin
Anna-Lena Hemström as Malou
Magnus Mark as Janne
Robert Gustafsson as Asthma-patient
Gunvor Pontén as Parrot's voice
Hans Alfredson as Himself
Tommy Körberg as Himself

References

External links
 
 

1993 films
1993 comedy films
Swedish comedy films
1990s Swedish-language films
1990s Swedish films